The 1978 Suisse Open Gstaad was a men's tennis tournament played on outdoor clay courts in Gstaad, Switzerland. It was the 33rd edition of the tournament and was held from 10 July through 16 July 1978. The tournament was part of the Grand Prix tennis circuit with a total prize money available of $75,000. First-seeded Guillermo Vilas won the singles title, his second at the tournament after 1974.

Finals

Singles
 Guillermo Vilas defeated  José Luis Clerc 6–3, 7–6, 6–4
 It was Vilas' 3rd singles title of the year and the 38th of his career.

Doubles
 Mark Edmondson /  Tom Okker defeated  Bob Hewitt /  Kim Warwick 6–4, 1–6, 6–1, 6–4

References

External links
 Official website
 ATP tournament profile
 ITF tournament edition details

Swiss Open (tennis)
Swiss Open Gstaad
1978 Grand Prix (tennis)